The German parliament or Reichstag that was elected in the general election of May 1928 and sat until that of September 1930 was the fourth parliament of the Weimar Republic.

Social Democratic Party of Germany
In German the Sozialdemokratische Partei Deutschlands, SPD.

 Hermann Beims (1863–1931)
 Paul Bader
 Arthur Arzt
 Siegfried Aufhäuser (1884–1969)
 Marie Arning (1887–1957)
 Maria Ansorge (1880–1955)
 Lore Agnes (1876–1953)
 Ferdinand Bender (1870–1939)
 Albert Bergholz entered Reichstag on 25 June 1929 for Krüger (Merseburg)
 Paul Bergmann
 Adolf Biedermann (1881–1933)
 Hans Böckler (1875–1951)
 Clara Bohm-Schuch (1879–1936)
 Heinrich Becker (Herborn) (1877–1964)
 Louis Biester (1882–1965)
 Wilhelm Bock
 Dr. Rudolf Breitscheid (1874–1944)
 August Brey (1864–1937)
 Conrad Broßwitz
 Alwin Brandes (1866–1949
 Otto Braun (Düsseldorf) (1872–1955)
 Otto Buchwitz (1879–1964)
 Albert Bülow
 Arthur Crispien (1875–1946)
 Dr. Eduard David (1863–1930)
 Karoline Dettmer, SPD, entered Reichstag on 17 January 1930 for Schlüter
 Georg Dietrich (Thüringen) (1888-unknown)
 Wilhelm Dittmann (1874–1954)
 Friedrich Ebert (Potsdam) (1894–1979)
 Otto Eggerstedt (1886–1933)
 Albert Falkenberg entered Reichstag on 25 August 1928 on the basis of a corrected result of the Reichstag election in constituency No. 1 (East Prussia)
 Franz Feldmann (1868–1937)
 Gustav Ferl (1890–1970)
 Hermann Fleissner (1865–1939)
 August Frölich (Thüringen) (1877–1966)
 Otto Geiselhart entered Reichstag on 26 February 1929 for Abg. Saenger
 Paul Gerlach
 Emil Girbig
 Georg Graf (1881–1952)
 Peter Graßmann (1873–1939)
 Georg Graupe (Zwickau) (1875–1959) entered Reichstag on 15 February 1930 for Abg. Dr. Levi
 Otto Grotewohl (1894–1964)
 Ernst Heilmann (Frankfurt) (1881–1940)
 Hugo Heimann (Berlin) (1859–1951)
 Kurt Heinig (1886–1956)
 Alfred Henke
 Karl Hermann (1885–1973) left Reichstag on 12 May 1930
 Dr. Paul Hertz (1888–1961)
 Karl Hildenbrand (Württemberg) (1864–1935)
 Dr. Rudolf Hilferding (1877–1941)
 Johannes Hoffmann (Kaiserslautern) (1867–1930)
 Oskar Hünlich (1887–1963)
 Friedrich Ernst Husemann (1873–1935)
 Carl Jäcker
 Gerhard Jacobshagen
 Alfred Janschek (1874–1955)
 Marie Juchacz (1879–1956)
 Paul Junke
 August Karsten (1888-??)
 Wilhelm Keil (1870–1968)
 Franz Kotzke
 Hermann Krätzig (1871–1954)
 Wilhelm Kröger (Rostock)
 Richard Krüger (Merseburg) left Reichstag on 22 June 1929
 Bernhard Kuhnt (1876–1946)
 Marie Kunert
 Franz Künstler (1888–1942)
 Nanny Kurfürst, SPD
 Otto Landsberg (1869–1957)
 Dr. Julius Leber (1891–1945)
 Dr. Paul Levi (1883–1930) died on 9 February 1930
 Heinrich Wilhelm Limbertz
 Richard Lipinski (1867–1936)
 Carl Litke (1897–1962)
 Paul Löbe (1875–1967)
 Dr. Kurt Löwenstein (1895–1939)
 Josef Lübbring
 Konrad Ludwig
 Werner Lufft
 Karl Mache
 Ludwig Marum (1882–1934)
 Stefan Meier (Baden)
 Arthur Mertins (1898–1979) entered Reichstag on 28 August 1929 for Abg. Schulz (Königsberg)
 Franz Metz
 Oscar Meyer (Berlin)
 Dr. Julius Moses (1868–1942)
 Hermann Müller (Franken) (1876–1931)
 Anna Nemitz (1873–1962)
 Friedrich Nowack (1890–1959)
 Antonie Pfülf (1877–1933)
 Otto Friedrich Passehl (Pommern),
 Friedrich Peine
 Franz Peters (1888-??)
 Heinrich Peus
 Friedrich Puchta (1883–1945)
 Dr. Ludwig Quessel
 Johanna Reitze (1878–1949)
 Adam Remmele (Baden) (1877–1951)
 Heinrich Richter (Hildesheim)
 Max Richter (Schleswig-Holstein)
 Dr. Kurt Rosenfeld (1877–1943)
 Erich Roßmann (Württemberg) (1884–1953)
 Alwin Saenger died on 18 February 1929
 Hugo Saupe (Leipzig) (1883-??)
 Joseph Schaffner
 Franz Scheffel
 Philipp Scheidemann (1865–1939)
 Luise Schiffgens
 Richard Schiller
 Johannes Schirmer (Dresden)
 Alexander Schlicke (1863–1940)
 Wilhelm Schlüter died am 8 January 1930
 Robert Schmidt (Berlin) (1864–1943)
 Georg Schmidt (Cöpenick) (1875–1946)
 Richard Schmidt (Meißen) (1871–1945)
 Georg Schöpflin
 Carl Schreck (Bielefeld) (1873–1956)
 Adele Schreiber-Krieger
 Louise Schroeder (Schleswig-Holstein) (1887–1957)
 Hermann Schulz (Königsberg) died on 20 August 1929
 Berta Schulz (Westfalen)
 Oswald Schumann (Frankfurt)
 Gustav Schumann (Stettin)
 Hans Seidel
 Tony Sender (1888–1964)
 Max Seppel
 Carl Severing (1875–1952)
 Max Seydewitz (1892–1987)
 Dr. Anna Siemsen (1882–1951)
 Dr. August Siemsen (Thüringen) (1884–1958) entered Reichstag on 17 May 1930 for Abg. Hermann
 Josef Simon (Franken)
 Georg Simon (Schwaben)
 Wilhelm Sollmann (1881–1951)
 Heinrich Schulz (Bremen) (1872–1932)
 Karl Spiegel
 Wilhelm Staab
 Friedrich Stampfer (1874–1957)
 Dr. Anna Stegmann
 Willy Steinkopf (1885–1953)
 Johannes Stelling (1877–1933)
 Heinrich Ströbel (1869–1944)
 Daniel Stücklen (1869–1945)
 Fritz Tarnow (1880–1951)
 Paul Taubadel (1875–1937)
 Hermann Tempel
 Johannes Thabor
 Carl Ulrich (Hessen) (1853–1933)
 Hans Unterleitner (1890–1971)
 Johann Vogel (1881–1945)
 Klara Weich
 Otto Wels (1872–1939)
 Carl Wendemuth
 Georg Wendt
 Rudolf Wissell (1869–1962)
 Otto Witte
 Mathilde Wurm (1874–1935)
 Hermann Müller (Lichtenberg) (1868–1932
 Michael Schnabrich (1880–1939)

German National People's Party
In German Deutschnationale Volkspartei, DNVP.

 Dr. Dirk Agena
 Dr. Paul Bang
 Gustav von Bartenwerffer, DNVP, entered Reichstag 4 April 1930 for Abg. Schiele
 Georg Bachmann, DNVP
 Wilhelm Bazille (1874–1934), DNVP
 Emil Berndt, DNVP
 Franz Biener (1866–1940), DNVP
 Wilhelm Bruhn (1869–1951), DNVP, left the party October 1929 and became an independent member
 Wilhelm Dingler, DNVP
 Alwin Domsch (Dresden), DNVP
 Dr. Gottfried von Dryander, DNVP
 Botho-Wendt Graf zu Eulenburg, DNVP
 Dr. Friedrich Everling, DNVP
 Dr. Axel Freiherr von Freytag-Loringhoven, DNVP
 Curt Wilhelm Fromm, DNVP
 Heinrich Gerns (1892–1963), DNVP
 Georg Gottheiner, DNVP
 Walther Graef (Thüringen), DNVP
 Gottfried Gok, DNVP
 Hans von Goldacker, DNVP
 Heinrich Haag, DNVP
 Robert Hampe, DNVP
 Dr. Alfred Hanemann, DNVP
 Georg Hartmann, DNVP
 Dr. Johann Jacob Haßlacher, DNVP
 Oskar Hergt (1869–1967), DNVP
 Dr. Alfred Hugenberg (1865–1951), DNVP
 Emil Hemeter, DNVP
 Willy Jandrey (1877–1945), DNVP
 Dr. Fritz Kleiner, DNVP, entered Reichstag 2 December 1929 for Abg. Wolf (Oppeln)
 Wilhelm Koch (Düsseldorf), DNVP
 Dr. Albrecht Philipp (1883–1962), DNVP
 Dr. Dr. Dietrich Preyer, DNVP
 Wilhelm Vogt (Württemberg), DNVP
 Max Wallraf, DNVP
 Kurt Wege, DNVP
 Kuno Graf von Westarp (1864–1945)
 Dr. Erich Wienbeck
 Edgar Wolf (Oppeln) resigned 30 November 1929
 Johannes Wolf (Stettin)
 Dr. Ernst Oberfohren (1881–1933), DNVP - party chairman from 12 December 1929 
 Wilhelm Ohler
 Dr. Reinhold Quaatz
 Hans von Troilo
 Dr. Walther Rademacher
 Dr. Jakob Reichert
 Praetorius Freiherr von Richthofen
 Carl Rieseberg
 Hans Sachs (1874–1947), National Liberal Land Party, Guest of the DNVP
 Walter Stubbendorff
 D. Hermann Strathmann
 Martin Schiele (1870–1939), DNVP, resigned 31 March 1930
 Dr. Karl Steiniger
 Hermann Staffehl (Potsdam)
 Otto Schmidt (Hannover) (1888–1971)
 Otto Schmidt (Stettin)
 Hermann Schröter (Liegnitz)
 Georg Schultz (Bromberg) (1860–1945)
 Max Soth
 Dr. Martin Spahn (1875–1945)
 Ernst Mentzel
 Paula Müller-Otfried (1865–1946)
 Wilhelm Laverrenz (1879–1955)
 Annagrete Lehmann
 Bernhard Leopold
 Paul von Lettow-Vorbeck (1870–1964)
 Heinrich Lind later independent

Later formed CNAG
These DNVP members later merged with CNBL to form the Christian National Labor Society (Christlich-Nationale Arbeitsgemeinschaft, CNAG).

 Emil Hartwig (Berlin)
 Dr. Otto Hoetzsch (1876–1946)
 Gottfried Treviranus (1891–1971)
 Franz Behrens (1872–1943)
 Gustav Hülser
 Wilhelm Mönke
 D. Reinhard Mumm (1873–1932)
 Walter von Keudell (1884–1973)
 Moritz Klönne
 Walther Lambach
 Dr. Paul Lejeune-Jung (1882–1944)
 Hans Erdmann von Lindeiner-Wildau
 Hans Schlange (1886–1960)

Centre Party (Germany)
In German Zentrum.
 Josef Andre left Reichstag on 31 October 1928
 Adalbert Beck (Oppeln)
  (Arnsberg) (1875–1955)
 Dr. Johannes Bell (1868–1949)
 Franz Bielefeld
 Johannes Blum (Krefeld) (1857–1946)
 Dr. Fritz Bockius
 Eugen Bolz (1881–1945)
 Franz Bornefeld-Ettmann
 Dr. Heinrich Brauns (Köln) (1868–1939)
 Dr. Heinrich Brüning (1885–1970)
 Dr. August Crone-Münzebrock
 Anton Damm
 Dr. Friedrich Dessauer (1881–1963)
 Carl Diez (1877–1969)
 Dr. Johannes Drees
 Franz Ehrhardt (1880–1956)
 Joseph Ersing (1882–1956)
 Thomas Esser
 Heinrich Fahrenbach
 Franz Feilmayr
 Dr. Ernst Föhr (Baden)
 Hedwig Fuchs entered Reichstag on  8 March 1929 for Lammers
 Otto Gerig
 Johannes Giesberts (1865–1938)
 Johannes Groß entered Reichstag on 7 November 1928 for Andre
 Theodor von Guérard (1863–1943)
 Heinrich Hartwig (Oppeln)
 Dr. Andreas Hermes (1878–1964)
 Carl Herold
 Hermann Hofmann (Ludwigshafen)
 Heinrich Imbusch (1878–1945)
 Josef Joos (1878–1965)
 Dr. Ludwig Kaas (Trier) (1881–1952)
 Peter Kerp
 Florian Klöckner
 Dr. Heinrich Köhler (1878–1949)
 Clemens Lammers left Reichstag on 1 March 1929
 Wilhelm Marx (1863–1946)
 Georg Nauheim
 Agnes Neuhaus (1854–1944)
 Hugo Neumann
 Matthias Neyses
 Hans Nientimp later independent
 Dr. Ludwig Perlitius
 Franz Riesener
 Adam Stegerwald (1874–1945)
 Richard Schönborn
 Paul Schulz-Gahmen
 D. Dr. Georg Schreiber (1882–1963)
 Josef Sinn resigned 11 April 1929
 Jean-Albert Schwarz (Frankfurt) (1873–1957)
 Dr. Rudolf Schetter (Köln) entered Reichstag on 18 April 1929 for Sinn
 Peter Schlack (1875–1957)
 Christine Teusch (1888–1968)
 Peter Tremmel
 Karl Ulitzka
 Brunislaus Warnke
 Helene Weber (1881–1962)
  (1888–1976)
 Franz Wieber (1858–1933)
 Heinrich Wilkens (Liegnitz)
 Dr. Joseph Wirth (1879–1956)
 Dr. Heinrich Krone (1895–1989)

Communist Party of Germany
 Martha Arendsee (1885–1953)
 Dr. Eduard Alexander (1881–1945)
 Julius Adler (1894–1945)
 Paul Bertz (1886–1950)
 Theodor Beutling (1898-vermutl. 1937)
 Conrad Blenkle (1901–1943)
 Albert Buchmann (1894–1975)
 Franz Dahlem (1892–1981)
 Jakob Dautzenberg (1897–1979)
 Philipp Dengel (1888–1948)
 Paul Dietrich (Berlin) (1889- vermutl. 1937))
 Adolf Ende (1899–1951)
 Arthur Ewert (Thüringen) (1890–1959)
 Wilhelm Florin (1894–1944)
 Paul Frölich (Leipzig) (1884–1953) until the end of 1928 (KPO)
 Ottomar Geschke (1882–1957),
 Hugo Gräf (Dresden) (1892–1958),
 Friedrich Heckert (1884–1936)
 Wilhelm Hein (1889–1958)
 Emil Höllein (1880–1929) died on 18 August 1929
 Edwin Hoernle (1883–1952)
 Anton Jadasch (1888–1964)
 Georg Kaßler (1887–1962)
 Willy Leow (1887–1937)
 Max Maddalena (1895–1943)
 Peter Maslowski (1893-?)
 Johann Meyer (Franken) (1889–1950)
 Josef Miller (Hannover) (1883–1964)
 Wilhelm Münzenberg (1889–1940)
 Dr. Theodor Neubauer (Berlin) (1890–1945)
 Helene Overlach (1894-1983)
 Paul Papke
 Nikolaus Pfaff, KPD, entered Reichstag on 24 August 1929 for Höllein
 Hans Pfeiffer (1895–1968)
 Wilhelm Pieck (1876–1960)
 Ernst Putz (1896–1933
 Siegfried Rädel (1893–1943)
 Paul Redlich
 Maria Reese (1889–1958), SPD, in November 1929 alternate of the KPD
 Hermann Remmele (Berlin) (1880–1939)
 Wilhelm Repschläger (1870–1945), KPD
 Heinrich Schmitt (Merseburg) (1895–1951)
 Ernst Schneller (1890–1944)
 Paul Schreck (Baden) (1892–1948)
 Walter Stoecker (1891–1931), KPD, floor leader from 1929
 Max Strötzel (1885–1945)
 Ernst Thälmann (1886–1944)
 Matthias Thesen (1891–1944)
 Ernst Torgler (1893–1963), KPD - floor leader to 1929
 Walter Ulbricht (Westfalen) (1893–1973)
 Artur Vogt (Westfalen) (1894–1964)
 Clara Zetkin (1857–1933)
 Hans Kippenberger (1898–1937)
 Hans Kollwitz (1893–1948)
 Wilhelm Koenen (1886–1963)

German People's Party
 Helmuth Albrecht
 Dr. Michael Bayersdörfer, BVP
 Johann Becker (Hessen) (1869–1951)
 Heinrich Beythien
 Theodor Bickes
 Franz Brüninghaus
 Friedrich Cramm
 Dr. Carl Cremer
 Dr. Julius Curtius (1877–1948)
 Walther Dauch (Hamburg)
 Eduard Dingeldey (1886–1942)
 Adolf Findeisen
 Erich von Gilsa
 Christian Günther
 Heinrich Janson
 Dr. Friedrich Pfeffer
 Dr. Albert Zapf
 Dr. Johannes Wunderlich  left Reichstag on 31 March 1930
 August Winnefeld
 Otto Thiel
 Dr. Heinrich Runkel
 Werner Freiherr von Rheinbaben
 Dr. Johannes Rammelt, DVP, entered Reichstag on 3 October 1929 for Dr. Kulenkampff
 Hans von Raumer (1870–1965)
 Ernst Hamkens
 Heinrich Havemann, DVP, entered Reichstag on 12 October 1929 for Dr. Stresemann
 Dr. Doris Hertwig-Bünger
 Ernst Hintzmann
 Dr. Curt Hoff
 Adolf Hueck
 Dr. Otto Hugo (1878–1942)
 Dr. Elsa Matz
 Dr. Fritz Mittelmann (1886–1932)
 Dr. Paul Moldenhauer
 Albrecht Morath
 D. Dr. Wilhelm Kahl (1849–1932)
 Dr. Wilhelm Kalle
 Siegfried von Kardorff
 Otto Keinath entered Reichstag on 2 April 1930 for Dr. Wunderlich
 Adolf Kempkes
 Dr. Walther Kulenkampff died on 29 September 1929
 Eugen Köngeter
 Richard Leutheußer (1867–1945)
 Albrecht Graf zu Stolberg-Wernigerode (1886–1948)
 Dr. Gustav Stresemann (1878–1929) died 3 October 1929
 Dr. Heinrich Schnee (1871–1949)
 Dr. Rudolph Schneider (Dresden)
 Dr. Ernst Scholz
 Carl Schmid (Düsseldorf)

German Democratic Party
 Dr. Gertrud Bäumer (1873–1954)
 Franz Bartschat  entered Reichstag on 10 March 1930 for Dr. Hellpach
 Georg Bernhard
 Johannes Büll
 Dr. Bernhard Dernburg (1865–1937)
 Hermann Dietrich (Baden) (1879–1954)
 Gustav Ehlermann
 Anton Erkelenz (1878–1945)
 Otto Fischbeck (1865–1939)
 Dr. Hermann Fischer (Köln) (1873–1940
 Paul Ziegler
 Dr. Philipp Wieland
 Theodor Tantzen left Reichstag 4 May 1930
 Dr. Emilie Kiep-Altenloh (1888–1985) entered Reichstag on 9 May 1930 for Herr Tantzen
 Erich Koch-Weser (1875–1944)
 Dr. Wilhelm Külz (1875–1948)
 Heinrich Rönneburg
 Dr. Peter Reinhold
 Dr. Ludwig Haas (Baden) died 2 August 1930
 Dr. Willy Hellpach, (1877–1955) left Reichstag 6 March 1930
 Dr. Hermann Hummel (1876–1952)
 Ernst Lemmer (1898–1970)
 Marie Elisabeth Lüders (1878–1966)
 Georg Sparrer
 Otto Schuldt (Steglitz)
 Gustav Schneider (Berlin)

Reich Party of the German Middle Class
In German the Reichspartei des deutschen Mittelstandes. Later renamed the Economic Party, Wirtschaftspartei in German.
 Oskar Beier (Dresden)
 Fritz Borrmann
 Dr. Dr. Johann Viktor Bredt (1879–1940)
 Otto Colosser
 Hermann Drewitz
 Johannes Dunkel
 Wilhelm François
 Franz Freidel
 Carl Freybe
 Dr. Franz Jörissen
 Karl Pallmann
 Artur Petzold
 Franz Holzamer
 Heinrich Hömberg
 Hans Hetzel
 Jacob Ludwig Mollath
 Emil Köster
 Karl Lauterbach
 Ernst Lucke
 Wilhelm Lünenschloß died on 10 July 1929
 Gotthard Sachsenberg
 Otto Strauß
 Wilhelm Siegfried
 Robert Schulte (Westfalen) appointed to Reichstag on 22 July 1929 for Herr Lünenschloß

Bavarian People's Party
 Alois Albert
 Franz Dauer (Niederbayern)
 Sebastian Diernreiter
 Erich Emminger (1880–1951)
 Franz Gerauer
 Dr. Joseph Pfleger
 Hans Rauch (München)
 Karl Troßmann (Nürnberg)
 Franz Herbert
 Dr. Michael Horlacher (München) (1888–1957)
 Franz Xaver Lang
 Thusnelda Lang-Brumann
 Johann Leicht
 Martin Loibl
 Rudolf Schwarzer (Oberbayern)
 Franz Schmitt (Franken)

National Socialist German Workers' Party
 Walter Buch (1883–1949)
 Wilhelm Dreher
 Franz Ritter von Epp (1868–1946)
 Gottfried Feder (Sachsen) (1883–1941)
 Dr. Wilhelm Frick (1877–1946)
 Dr. Joseph Goebbels (1897–1945)
 Hermann Göring (1893–1946)
 Ernst Graf zu Reventlow
 Franz Stöhr (1879–1938)
 Gregor Straßer (1892–1934)
 Josef Wagner (1899–1945)
 Werner Willikens (Hannover)

Christian National Farmers and Countryfolk Party
In German the Christlich-Nationale Bauern- und Landvolkpartei, CNDL. This party later merged with dissident DNVP members to form the Christian National Labor Society (Christlich-Nationale Arbeitsgemeinschaft, CNAG)

 Franz Bauer (Sachsen)
 Friedrich Döbrich
 Wilhelm Dorsch (Hessen)
 Hermann Julier
 Dr. Albrecht Wendhausen
 Willi Neddenriep
 Franz Hänse
 Karl Hepp, (1889–1970)
 Heinrich von Sybel

German Farmers Party
 Hans Eder (Niederbayern)
 Georg Eisenberger (1863–1945)
 Anton Fehr (München) (1881–1954)
 Carl Gandorfer
 Franz Haindl
 August Hillebrand (Schlesien)
 Andreas Kerschbaum
 Fritz Kling

German-Hanoverian Party
 August Arteldt
 Ludwig Alpers (1866–1959)
 Adolf Freiherr von Hammerstein-Loxten
 Heinrich Meyer (Hannover)

Reich Party for Civil Rights and Deflation
In German the Reichspartei für Volksrecht und Aufwertung

 Dr. Georg Best
 Emil Herberg (Zwickau) came in for Dr. Lobe 3 January 1930
 Dr. Adolf Lobe left Reichstag 31 December 1929

References

Politics of the Weimar Republic
Members of the German Reichstag